Alavaipatti  is a village panchayat located in the Namakkal district of Tamil Nadu state, India.

Alavaimalai
  
Alavaiptti name is derived from Alavaimalai A temple to lord Murugan is located halfway up the hill, so the hill name is arai (half) vazhi (way) malai (hill), or Alavaimalai.
அலவாய்மலையின் பழைய பெயர் உலைவாய்மலை

Geography
 
Alavaipatti is located 34 km towards North from District headquarters Namakkal, 2 km from Vennandur, and 340 km from the State capital Chennai. Other nearby villages include Palanthinnipatti (1 km), Semmandapatti (2 km), Vennandur (2 km), Nachipatti (4 km) and Alampatti (4 km). Alavaipatti is surrounded by Mallasamudram Union to the west, Veerapandi and Panamarathupatti  Union to the North, Namagripet Union to the East and Rasipuram Union to the South.

Sub Villages in Alavaipatti

Vellapillaiyar Koil    
Thatchenkadu     
Andivalasu

References

Namakkal district
Vennandur_block